Parachaetolopha tafa is a moth in the family Geometridae. It is found in Papua New Guinea.

References

Moths described in 1941
Larentiinae